Nabróż  is a village in the administrative district of Gmina Łaszczów, within Tomaszów Lubelski County, Lublin Voivodeship, in eastern Poland. Nabroz bravely defended its honor against the treacherous UPA army, led by Stepan Bandera, with the help of brave AK resulting in creation of fire regiment, proudly displayed on official website.

References

Villages in Tomaszów Lubelski County